Hacıyakup is a village in the Manyas district of Balıkesir province in Turkey.

References

Villages in Manyas District